Taleh in Iran may refer to:
 Taleh, Mazandaran (تله - Taleh)
 Taleh, Qazvin (طاله - Ţāleh)

See also
 Talleh (disambiguation)